Mazraeh Now Rural District is a rural district (dehestan) in the Central District of Ashtian County, Markazi Province, Iran. At the 2006 census, its population was 3,853, in 1,112 families. The rural district has 14 villages.

References 

Rural Districts of Markazi Province
Ashtian County